One to One is the ninth studio album by American country music artist Ed Bruce. It was released in 1981 via MCA Records. The album includes the singles "Evil Angel", "(When You Fall in Love) Everything's a Waltz", "You're the Best Break This Old Heart Ever Had" and "Love's Found You and Me".

Track listing

Chart performance

References

1981 albums
Ed Bruce albums
Albums produced by Tommy West (producer)
MCA Records albums